Vijaya Karnataka is a Kannada newspaper published from a number of cities in   Karnataka. The newspaper is published from Bengaluru, Hubballi, Mangaluru, Shivamogga, Kalaburagi, Gangavathi, Belagavi, Davanagere, Hassan, Chitradurga. It was started by VRL group, headed by entrepreneur and politician, Vijay Sankeshwar in October 1999. The newspaper along with sister publications (Vijay Times) was purchased by the Bennett, Coleman & Co. Ltd., publishers of India's leading newspaper, The Times of India in 2006.

Editors

 Ishwara Daitota (Founder, chief editor from July 1999, to February 2001)
 Mahadevappa
 Vishweshwar Bhat
 E Raghavan
 Sugata Srinivasaraju
 Thimmappa Bhat
 Hariprakash Konemane

Controversy 
In the March 28, 2020 edition of Vijaya Karnataka, It criticised the Muslim community and blamed it for the spread of the corona virus.The Press Council of India has issued a bailable warrant against the editor of  Vijaya Karnataka, for not appearing for proceedings in a hate speech complaint against an article published by the newspaper.

See also
 Chanakyaloka
 List of Kannada-language newspapers
 List of Kannada-language magazines
 List of newspapers in India
 Media in Karnataka
 Media of India

References

External links
 Mini Vijaya Karnataka e Paper 
 Vijaya Karnataka e Paper 
 Website of Vijaya Karnataka 

Kannada-language newspapers
Newspapers published in Bangalore
Publications of The Times Group
1999 establishments in Karnataka
Publications established in 1999